Dava Aldiansyah Ramadhan (born 12 April 2000) is an Indonesian professional footballer who plays as a defender for Liga 1 club Persikabo 1973.

Club career

TIRA-Persikabo
He was signed for TIRA-Persikabo to play in Liga 1 in the 2020 season. Dava made his league debut on 8 March 2020 in a match against PSS Sleman. This season was suspended on 27 March 2020 due to the COVID-19 pandemic. The season was abandoned and was declared void on 20 January 2021.

Career statistics

Club

Notes

References

External links
 Dava Ramadhan at Soccerway
 Dava Ramadhan at Liga Indonesia

2000 births
Living people
Indonesian footballers
Persikabo 1973 players
Association football defenders
Sportspeople from Jakarta